Stefan Stoev (born 1977 in Sofia) is an Austrian entrepreneur, philanthropist and supporter of the arts.

Education
Stoev has a PhD Degree in Information Technology and Economics, a master's degree in International Finance and Economics, a bachelor's degree in International Economic Affairs, and a Professional Degree in Foreign Affairs and Linguistics.

Life and philanthropy
Stoev served 2004/2005 as Austrian Gedenkdienst  representative at the Holocaust Memorial Museum in Washington, D.C. During this time he was engaged in scientific research at the Center for Advanced and Holocaust Studies, maintained contact to Holocaust Survivors and wrote on the book Time Bridge/Zeitbrücke. Upon his return in Austria he founded the cultural organization IDEA Society (Society for International Development and Enhancement of Arts). Stoev engaged in Cultural and Art Diplomacy, and promotes the intercultural dialogue by supporting Austrian and international artists worldwide. In 2008 he initiated the international Art project Pangaea in support of UNICEF. The outcome of this project was the creation of the art collection for World Peace, which since then is on travel exhibitions on all continents. Stoev established cooperations with peace museums and international topic related organizations. Followed by annual events as artistic tribute to the International Day of Peace and numerous lectures from Stoev on conferences at the United Nations and at the European Parliament. In 2011 Stoev was nominated as Ambassador for Peace from the Universal Peace Federation. For his contribution to  the promotion of arts and culture Stoev was honored in 2012 with the award of the Bulgarian Ministry of Culture. Among others Stoev realized the EU funded project for Harmonization of Culture and Arts between Austria and Turkey. Also in 2012 he participated as juror at the International Art for Peace Contest for Young People from the United Nations Office for Disarmament Affairs and the Harmony for Peace Foundation. In the same year Stoev organized in Vienna an exhibition for the sculptress and diplomat Gabriela von Habsburg on Art Diplomacy between the Danube and the Black Sea. In cooperation with the Academic Council of the United Nations System (ACUNS) in Vienna, the Universal Peace Federation (UPF) and the Austro-Brazilian NGO ABRASA, Stoev organized with the IDEA Society at the Vienna International Centre (VIC) the conference on "Culture as a Basic Element for Sustainable Development and Human Rights". Stoev helped for the successful theatre premiere of William Shakespeare's of the American Drama Group in Vienna and is since then regular supporter of the annual international event at the Stadtpalais Liechtenstein.

In 2013 Stoev organized an international exhibition on Humanity, with art works of :de:Manfred Bockelmann and Pangaea, moderated by Danielle Spera. Stoev applied on behalf of the IDEA Society the NGO Special Consultative Status with the ECOSOC of the United Nations Economic and Social Council (ECOSOC), which was granted in 2014 upon the decision of the Committee on NGOs in New York City.

As entrepreneur Stoev is the Co-founder and CEO of the Austrian mining company MINEX and Angel Investor in the Green Hi-Tech Company HFX.

In 2021 Stoev was appointed as European Climate Pact Ambassador in Austria to the European Commission, European Union.

Other Wikis 
 Wiki FR

Publications
 Women of Society Lea Fuchs and Ljubomir Dimov 2015 
 Любомир Димов – Българският майстор на цветовете и пъстрите мотиви придобил международно признание, Black&White Magazine, 10.10.2014
 Bringing Cultures Together Through the Arts to Facilitate Cultural Diplomacy in the Context of the European Project, International Conference on Cultural Diplomacy in the EU, Brüssel, 2011
 Zeitbrücke - Generationskontakte, Geschichtseinblicke, Freundschaften, 2005
 "I wanted to be sent to Europe to participate in the struggle against the Nazis." A Conversation with German Survivor Gerald Schwab, Jewish News, 4.01.2007

References

Living people
1977 births
Bulgarian emigrants to Austria
Austrian philanthropists
Austrian businesspeople
Museum people